The 1991 Nicholls State Colonels football team represented Nicholls State University as a member of the Southland Conference during the 1991 NCAA Division I-AA football season. Led by fifth-year head coach Phil Greco, the Colonels compiled an overall record of 4–7 with mark of 2–5 in conference play, tying for sixth place in the Southland. Nicholls State played home games at John L. Guidry Stadium in Thibodaux, Louisiana.

Schedule

References

Nicholls State
Nicholls Colonels football seasons
Nicholls State Colonels football